Sturgeon was a provincial electoral district in Alberta, Canada mandated to return a single member to the Legislative Assembly of Alberta from 1905 to 1940.

History

Members of the Legislative Assembly (MLAs)

Election results

1905 general election

1909 general election

1912 by-election

1913 general election

1917 general election

1921 general election

1926 general election

1930 general election

1935 general election

See also
List of Alberta provincial electoral districts

References

Further reading

External links
Elections Alberta
The Legislative Assembly of Alberta

Former provincial electoral districts of Alberta